"Possible Theme for a Future TV Drama Series" is a song by Australian band Mental As Anything, released in November 1979 as the second single from the album Get Wet and the song reached at number 57 on the Kent Music Report. The song was written by Mental As Anything lead vocalist Martin Plaza.

Track listing

Personnel 
 Martin Plaza — lead vocals, guitar    
 Greedy Smith — lead vocals, keyboards, harmonica
 Reg Mombassa — guitar, vocals  
 Peter O'Doherty — bass, guitar, vocals 
 Wayne de Lisle – drums

Charts

References 

Mental As Anything songs
1979 songs
1979 singles
Regular Records singles
Songs written by Martin Plaza